Darna is a moth genus of the family Limacodidae.

References

External links

Limacodidae genera
Limacodidae
Taxa named by Francis Walker (entomologist)